Julio Alba (9 July 1922 – 25 December 1997) was an Argentine cyclist. He competed in the team pursuit event at the 1948 Summer Olympics. Alba also won four consecutive national titles from 1944 to 1947.

References

External links
 

1922 births
1997 deaths
Argentine male cyclists
Olympic cyclists of Argentina
Cyclists at the 1948 Summer Olympics
Place of birth missing